The New Cold War may refer to:

 Second Cold War, a term typically associated with tensions between either the United States and China or the United States and Russia
 New Cold War (1979–1985), an intensive reawakening of Cold War tensions.
The New Cold War: Putin's Russia and the Threat to the West, a 2008 book by  Edward Lucas
The New Cold War: Moscow v. Pekin, a 1963 book by Edward Crankshaw
The new Cold War?: Religious Nationalism Confronts the Secular State, a 1993 book by Mark Juergensmeyer
The New Cold War: Revolutions, Rigged Elections, and Pipeline Politics in the Former Soviet Union, a 2007 book by Mark MacKinnon

See also 
Cold War